The Lviv tram (translit.: L’vivs’kyi tramvai) is an electric tram in Lviv, Ukraine. It is the only tram system in the Western Ukraine, and the largest among narrow-gauge tram systems in Ukraine.

From 1880 to 1908, the trams used a horse-drawn system, converting to an electric system after 1894. It is the first in the territory of modern Ukraine to have a system of horse-drawn trams, or any type of tram, as well as the second one after the Kyiv trams to use electricity.

The tram system's greatest height was reached on the eve of the Second World War, when it was the main transport system of the city; from the middle of the 20th century it gradually lost its position. In 2010, the tram accounted for 24.4% of passenger traffic in the city. As of January 1, 2022, there were 8 routes in the system, operated by the utility "LKP Lvivelectrotrans". At the end of 2021, 24,678,300 paid passengers (including 2,785,623 students) used the services of trams and trolleybuses. In 2021, trams performed 3.79 million km of transportation work (vehicle-km). The length of the tracks and contact network is 81.85 km (2022), and the route network is 99.1 km (2022).

It is planned that in the future the tram will become a primary mode of transport in Lviv.

History

Horse-tram 
The first time the possibility of a horse-drawn tram in Lviv was discussed was in the late 1860s. In 1870, a project for the construction of a horse-drawn tram in Lviv was developed by two British firms but was rejected by the Lviv City Council. However, in 1878, when it became clear that without public transport the city could not thrive, the city council announced a competition for the construction of tramways. Applications were filed by Belgian and Trieste tram companies. The commission created by the magistrate preferred the Trieste Tramway Company ("Societa Triestina Tramway" ), and a contract was signed on February 1, 1879.  After this initial step and after 25 years of operation, the tram network became the property of the city. On May 21, a construction plan was approved.

On November 25, 1879, a trial trip took place. Here is a description from November 27 of that year found in "Lvivska Gazeta" :

The first tram in Ukraine was opened in Lviv on May 3, 1880. After May 5, payment for travel was introduced. The newspaper "Dilo" wrote on this subject:

There were two lines functioning (the main railway station - Gorodotska Street, the Customs Square and the main railway station - Podzamce ), which transported an average of 1,867,000 passengers per year. In 1889, there were 105 horses and 37 passenger and 3 freight cars made in the Austrian city of Graz. They were dark brown with white inscriptions reading "Lviv Tram", decorated with a red border. In the summer, each wagon was pulled by a couple of horses, but on the streets of Gorodotska and Shevchenko, the wagons were pulled by three horses when ascending, and one when descending (accordingly, the fare was also different). When snow fell, the number of horses was increased to four. The average speed was 6.4 km / h. The paths were oak, with a width of 1000 mm. The staff numbered 70 people.

In 1905, negotiations began on the issue of a municipal-operated horse-drawn tram, the possibility of which was foreseen after 25 years of exploitation. The contract for the purchase of the city network was signed on July 8, 1906, but the transfer of property extended for 11 months.

Steam Tram 
In 1888 the Society of Lviv-Belz Railways submitted a project for the construction of a steam tram to the Lviv magistracy. The Belga railroad had a station in Lviv on the site of the modern station of Kleparov – then it was the outskirts of the city – which was not connected by public transport to the centre, which became an obstacle for rail passengers; therefore the construction of the steam tram was designed primarily for them. According to the project, construction of two lines was foreseen: the first one was to go from the station of Cleparas to the station of Pidzamche by the streets of Shevchenko, Rappoport, Dzherelnaya, under the Oak and Turkish. The second one was to go from the station of Cleparts to the streets of Shevchenko and Zaliznychnaya, past Chernivtsi station, the streets of Bandera, Nechuya-Levitsky, Vitovsky, Franko and Lychakivsky to Lychakiv station. The idea of a steam tram had become widely publicised in Lviv, but the project of the Lviv-Belz Railroad Association did not find support from city officials.

The second time the construction of a steam tram in Lviv was raised in 1892–93. Then the Mortgage Joint-Stock Bank of Lviv offered the city council a concession for laying the line from the Church of St. Anne's Shevchenko Street to Yanov, but this project was not implemented.

Origin of the Electric Tram 
In 1893, the Lviv Magistrate announced a tender for the construction of electric tram lines and 400 hp (300 kW) power plants, since the horse-drawn tram was no longer able to cope with the area's growing transportation needs. It was won by the German firm Siemens & Halske, which obliged after two years of demands from the city council. On March 23, 1893, the project budget was approved amounting to 880,000 crowns. Construction of the electric tram line began in September 1893. By May 15, 1894, the Lviv newspaper "Dilo" wrote:

On May 31, 1894, the regular route of the electric tram was opened in Lviv, being the second in Ukraine and the fourth in Austria-Hungary. The length of the lines were 8.3 km. The following routes were performed (current street names are given): "Svobody ave - Stepan Bandera street - (main station) " , " Svobody Avenue - Ivan Franko Street - Stryisky Park " and " Freedom Avenue - Lychakivska Street - Lychakiv ". The opening was timed to the 1894 National Exhibition, held in Stryi Park.

There was a mixed reception to the emergence of an electric tram in Lviv. The wives of Lviv's horse-driven tram workers, who lived on Lychak, bombarded the first electric tram with tomatoes and rotten eggs. According to Ilkam Lemkom, "some Miss Skorobetska, the wife of the driver who lost his job, wrote in a respectable Lviv newspaper that she had, "made a proposal to the tram physically impossible to execute, with appropriate gestures." In simpler language, this meant that the woman, having thrown her skirt and leaning back to the tramway, urged him to kiss her in one place."

In 1896, the city bought a network of electric trams and a power plant for 1,680,000 crowns.

Prior to the First World War 
In 1907, the Ministry of Railways of the Austrian Empire allowed conversion of the horse-drawn trams to use electric traction. Thus, the following routes were opened, beginning with Svobody Avenue: Bogdan Khmelnytsky to Pidzamchy, Zeleny to Lychakivskyi cemetery, Shevchenko to Kleparov, Gorodotsky to the train station, and Zamarstinovskaya to Zamarstinov. Horse-drawn operations ended December 29, 1908. The horses were sold, and the cars reworked to function with the electric wagons of the electric tram.

In 1907 a line was created for the "New World" (an area in Lviv), after which property prices in the then-most prestigious district of the city fell by half. In 1908, trams extended to the Zhovkva horn, in 1910, to the High Castle and to the Snopki, and in 1914, to the station "Lychakiv". In the spring of 1914, the length of tram lines reached 24.4 km. The directions were marked with two Latin letters – the first letters of the names of the final stops in Polish. The stops had the following notation:
 D - main station
 N - Liberty Avenue (stop called "street Hetman" - the name of the then Avenue Liberty)
 J - Cleparais (the stop was called "Yanovskaya Street" - the then name of the street Shevchenko)
 K - Sofiyivka (the stop was called "Kilinsky Park" - the then name of Stryisky Park)
 L - New World (the stop was called "Street 29 November" - then the name of the street Konovalets)
 Ł - Lychakiv
 R or G - Pidzamche (Gavrilovka)
 R - Zhovkva slug
 U - High Castle (the stop was called "Street of the Union of Lublin" - the then name of the street Hutsulskoy)
 Z - Zamarstyniv

First World War and Interwar Period 

In September 1914, Russian troops entered Lviv. During their stay in the city (until June 22, 1915 ) the tram continued its work. At this time, a special guide was published in Russian of "Using the tram" (n. "As polzovatsya tram"). During the battle for the city in the Ukrainian-Polish war in November 1918, the grid suffered significant damage, resulting in service stopping in May 1919.

From October 1, 1922, traffic in Lviv, as in all of Poland, was converted to right-hand drive. Work was thus carried out on the re-positioning of turning arrows. From the autumn of 1923, in connection with the general standardisation in the republic, the numbers of routes were denoted by numbers.

In 1925, a line was laid to Bogdanovka and, the streets of Kulish Street were laid for unloading the Bogdan Khmelnitsky Street. In 1929 the "Railway Station - Kyiv Street - Franko Street" line was opened. By 1933, the total length of the tram network along the street axis was 32.8 km. In the tram administration were 119 motor vehicles, 58 trailer cars, and 5 snow-removal cars. The tramway consisted of two depots, car repair workshops and two traction substations with a total capacity of 6540 kW.

Second World War 
On September 1, 1939, during a raid of the German air force into the Second Commonwealth, rails and a contact network on Gorodotsky Street were damaged as a result of bombardment. The movement of trams on this site was stopped. After mid-September service stopped throughout the city. The regular operation of trams was restored on September 25, 1939, after the occupation of Lviv by the Red Army. During the Soviet occupation, new plans were put into operation - extension of existing lines: connecting the streets on Gorodotsky to the railway on Bogdanovka, the streets on Shevchenko to the railway, Zamarstinovskayato Street to Gorodnitsky Street, as well as the Lychakivska Street to the Pasichnaya Street.

During the German occupation, the Lviv tram continued to operate. However, on some routes, wagons with the words "Only for the Germans" could be seen and other cars were created with separate seats for the Germans, separated by a chain. Between 1940 and 1941 there were car-repair workshops, which during the period of occupation, rebuilt three cars on motor and 9 cars - on a trailer. It is known that during the occupation of the tram was used for military purposes, in particular, trailer carriages were made for the purpose of carrying prisoners.

Soviet Period 
During the battles for the city in June 1944, the tram factory was badly damaged. Its recovery was gradual: the first journey after the battles took place on March 1, 1945.

In accordance to the Treaty between the USSR and Poland, the Poles were relocated from Western Ukraine, who departed from the Second Commonwealth to the Ukrainian SSR in Western Poland(Operation Wisla). In this regard, approximately 400 employees (80% of staff) of the Tram Administration left their job. Due to lack of frames, the normal operation of the tram was interrupted. Employees began to recruit from the staff of the Lviv railway, as well as those in Eastern Ukraine.

By the summer of 1949, all routes had been restored. However, later there was the problem of old cars which had already been in operation for 50 years - these were modernised in the car repair workshops. New tramways consisted of two tied cars. The wooden parts in them had been replaced by metal, doors were arranged with pneumatic drives, and open outside areas were closed off. The upper part of the car was painted in blue, the bottom in yellow. As of January 1, 1950, the Lviv tramway consisted of two depots with a total capacity of 80 carriages, 185 passenger cars (of which 59 were trailer vehicles), 19 cargo platforms and snow blowers.

In 1959, the journey between Svoboda Avenue and Mickiewicz Square was stopped in order to allow room for the trolleybuses. Instead, a roundabout was set up near the Puppet Theater. In connection with the laying of trolleybus routes, the operation of trams was stopped along the following lines: on Bogdanovka(1953), on Kulish Street (1959), and on the streets of Zelena, Dniprovskaya and Levytskiy (1963). In 1952 to 1953 a line from Zhovkva horn was continued to the tram depot number 2 (near the meat processing plant).

In the 1950s, the renovation of the tram park was started. Due to the impossibility of using new one-way wagons (not designed for "shuttle traffic") in areas without turning rings, the Lviv tram line was forced to close the lines to the High Castle (route No. 12) and to the upper parts of the Ivan Franko Street (route No. 10). Since then, the minimum number of routes has been six.

During the 1970s, the city received a large number of new Tatra T-4SU and Tatra KT-4SU cars, which resulted in the introduction of many units from the 1970s (when travelling on two trained cars).

In 1978 a Lviv tramway trolleybus repair plant was delivered, designed for 400 major repairs per year. It began to serve urban transport companies not only in Lviv but also in other cities of Ukraine and Russia.

High Speed Tram 
In the 1960s plans for the construction of a high-speed, partly underground tram were included in the prospective general plan of Lviv. Its design began in the late 1970s. At first, plans were made to build two tunnels with around metro size in the centre of the city (practically, metrotrams), and to link them to overground routes. The portals of the first tunnel, 2.2 km in length, were to be built in the Pidzamcha district and intersection of Franko Street and Snopkivska. This radius included the construction of two underground stations: "Old Town" (near the Old Market Square) and "Reunification Square" (now Halytska). Ports of the second tunnel of 3.2 km in length should have been located at the beginning of Sakharov Street and at the intersection of Lychakivs'ka and Mechnikov streets. Three underground stations were planned: "University", "Reunification Square" and "Vynnik Market". The second step was to build a third tunnel from Ivan Franko Square through the Citadel, Bandera Street and the railway station to Yanivsky Cemetery with the underground stations Polytechnic Institute, Kropyvnitsky Square and Station.

In 1987 the first portion of the overground high-speed line was built between street Sakharov to the streets of Science. Underground construction began with the erection of the first Potocki Palace in the courtyard, which led to damage to surrounding buildings. In light of this, as well as the financial crisis of the late 1980s, the project was frozen.

Modern trams

Today, the Lviv tramway runs 8 lines on 81 kilometers of tracks with approximately 70 cars. Previously in bad shape, many tracks were reconstructed in 2006, and more are to be reconstructed in subsequent years. Most of the trams are the KT4 type, produced by Czech ČKD Tatra Works. Older T4+T4 trams no longer operate. Pre-war Gothaer Waggonfabrik cars, which were built after 1910, are only used for maintenance and utility purposes. In 2000s and 2010s Lviv acquired 50 overhauled and modernised Tatra KT4 trams previously used in German cities Erfurt, Gera and Berlin, with them being the first new tramcar purchase since the independence of Ukraine.

In 1991, nearly 140 million passengers used the system. By 2002, this had decreased to 60 million. Despite a large number of passengers, approximately 65% of them ride free of charge. Thus, the considerable debt of the company must be covered by the government of the Lviv Oblast.

The price of a single trip was 50 kopecks (about €0.08) in 2007. It was raised to 75 kopecks (about €0.12) in 2008 and to 1 hrn in 2009. The price as of 2012 is 1 hrn and 50 kopecks, with the cost having risen from 1 hrn and 25 kopecks just prior to the Euro 2012 football championships as Lviv was one of the host cities. In April 2015 the price of a single trip was 2 hrn (about €0.08). It was then raised to 3 hrn in September 2017 and then to 5 hrn (about €0.2) in April 2018.

In September 2012, a contract to supply modern low-floor trams was awarded to Lvivelektrotrans, a joint venture of Electron and TransTec Vetschau. These newest additions to Lviv's long tram history were introduced in August 2013 and now run on route 9a. There are five sections in the 100% low floor tram Electron T5L64, designed by Lviv's constructors in the Lviv-based company Electron. In total, Lviv has 9 Electrons, one T5L64 and eight T3L44. Currently Lvivelectrotrans implementing several development projects with loans from EBRD and EIB. In particular, the purchase of new modern low-floor trams (10 units of Electron T5L64) in 2020 (with delivery till mid of 2023).

Images

Routes

See also
 Lviv trolleybus
 Lvivelectrotrans
 Lviv bus
 List of light-rail transit systems

References

External links

 lviv.tramvaj.ru - Lviv tram history  
 Tramway in Lviv 

Transport in Lviv
Tram transport in Ukraine
Lviv